The 1907–08 Bucknell Bison men's basketball team represented Bucknell University during the 1907–08 NCAA men's basketball season. The Bison's team captain was Charles O'Brien.

Schedule

|-

References

Bucknell Bison men's basketball seasons
Bucknell
Bucknell
Bucknell